Ben Hall is a 1975 Australian TV series based on the bush ranger Ben Hall. It stars Jon Finch as Ben Hall, Evin Crowley as Biddy Hall, John Castle as bushranger Frank Gardiner, Brian Blain as Sir Frederick Pottinger, Jack Charles as Billy Dargin and John Orcsik as John Gilbert (bushranger).

It was a co-production between ABC, BBC, and 20th Century Fox. It was called the most ambitious drama production of the ABC with a budget of $1 million.

References

External links
Ben Hall at Australian Television
Ben Hall at IMDb

Australian Broadcasting Corporation original programming
Australian drama television series
1975 Australian television series debuts
1975 Australian television series endings
Television shows set in New South Wales
Television shows set in colonial Australia